The R414 road is a regional road in Ireland, linking Monasterevin to Rathangan to Allenwood, all in County Kildare. The section from Rathangan to Allenwood takes it through the Bog of Allen and industrial peat works operated by Bord na Móna.

See also
Roads in Ireland
National primary road
National secondary road

References
Roads Act 1993 (Classification of Regional Roads) Order 2006 – Department of Transport

Regional roads in the Republic of Ireland
Roads in County Kildare